The following highways are numbered 452:

Canada
Manitoba Provincial Road 452

Japan
 Japan National Route 452

United Kingdom
, between Leamington Spa, Warwickshire and Brownhills, Staffordshire.

United States
  Maryland Route 452
  Oregon Route 452
  Pennsylvania Route 452
  Puerto Rico Highway 452
  Tennessee State Route 452